Dan Eckman (born January 27, 1984) is an American director, writer, and producer. Eckman first came to attention for his work in the sketch group Derrick Comedy.

Early life
Eckman was born on January 27, 1984, in Manchester, New Hampshire. He has been writing, producing, directing, and editing short films since the age of 15, and his work has been screened at numerous film festivals across the country. He graduated from New York University with a B.F.A. in Film and TV Production in 2005.

Career
Eckman's career began when he started making sketch videos for the Derrick Comedy group along with fellow members Donald Glover, Dominic Dierkes, DC Pierson, and Meggie McFadden. His NYU undergraduate thesis film, CHECKOUT, won several awards, including Best College Short at the 2006 HBO US Comedy Arts Festival in Aspen.

In 2009, Derrick Comedy released the film Mystery Team, Derrick's first endeavor into the feature film world. The film premiered at the 2009 Sundance Film Festival.

Before making Mystery Team, Eckman was the video production director for Blue Man Group, where his work was seen on the 57th Primetime Emmy Awards, the 2005 Billboard Music Awards, on PBS, at Universal Orlando and in the Boston Children's Museum, among others.

Eckman, along with his other Derrick partners with the exception of Glover, made a guest appearance on Community as Pierce's joke writers.

In 2011, Eckman directed the MTV film Worst. Prom. Ever. which starred Daryl Sabara and was produced by Pierson and McFadden.

In 2011, Eckman directed the very first Childish Gambino music video, Freaks and Geeks and the video for his single "Bonfire".

In 2011, Eckman directed the thirteenth episode of the third season of Community.

Personal life
Eckman was married to Meggie McFadden on July 10, 2010, in Paris.

Filmography

Television

References

External links

Dan Eckman's official site
Derrick Comedy
Sundance

1984 births
Living people
American directors
American male screenwriters
Tisch School of the Arts alumni
Film directors from New Hampshire